Slavyansk may refer to:
Sloviansk (Slavyansk), a town in Donetsk Oblast, Ukraine
Slavyansk-na-Kubani, a town in Krasnodar Krai, Russia

See also
Nikopol, Ukraine, a town in Dnipropetrovsk Oblast, Ukraine; known as Slovianske in 1779–1782
Slavic (disambiguation)
Slavyansky (disambiguation)
Slavyanka (disambiguation)